Manliftingbanner is a Dutch, communist hardcore punk band. They are best known for their merging of the straight edge lifestyle and radical politics, particularly communism, anti-racism, gay rights, and the DIY ethic. The band has been referred to as the first communist-straight edge band. It was originally named Profound. Due to the pretentious nature of their name, it was changed to Manliftingbanner after a Communist propaganda poster.

Manliftingbanner was cited as a major influence by Swedish hardcore punk band Refused, and Born from Pain frontman Rob Franssen.

Discography
All records were released on Crucial Response Records

 1991 - Myth of Freedom
 1992 - Ten Inches That Shook the World
 1995 - We Will Not Rest
 2012 - The Revolution Continues
 2015 - Red Fury

Band members
 Bart - Bass
 Paul - Guitar
 Olav - Drums
 Johannes - guitar
 Michiel - Vocals

Former members
 Big - Guitar

See also
Animal rights and punk subculture

Notes

References
 

Musical groups disestablished in 1993
Musical groups established in 1990
Dutch hardcore punk groups
Straight edge groups
Dutch communists
1990 establishments in the Netherlands